Gluck Peak is a rock peak,  high, located  south-southwest of Mount Borodin and immediately north of Alyabiev Glacier, lying between the bases of Bennett Dome and Shostakovich Peninsula on south side of the Beethoven Peninsula, southwest Alexander Island, Antarctica. It was first mapped from air photos taken by the Ronne Antarctic Research Expedition, 1947–48, by D. Searle of the Falkland Islands Dependencies Survey in 1960, and was named by the UK Antarctic Place-Names Committee after Christoph Willibald von Gluck, the Austrian composer (1714-1787).

See also 

 Holst Peak
 Ravel Peak
 Simon Peak

Further reading 
  J.L. SMELLIE, Lithostratigraphy of Miocene-Recent, alkaline volcanic fields in the Antarctic Peninsula and eastern Ellsworth Land, Antarctic Science 71 (3): 362-378 (1999)

External links 

 Gluck Peak on USGS website
 Gluck Peak on SCAR website
 Gluck Peak location on Satellite image
 Gluck Peak - distance calculator

References

Christoph Willibald Gluck
Mountains of Alexander Island